Wang Zengyi (born 24 June 1983 in Tianjin, China) is a Chinese-Polish table tennis player. He competed for Poland at the 2012 Summer Olympics. As of August 2016, he is ranked the no. 46 player in the world.

References

1983 births
Living people
Polish male table tennis players
Table tennis players at the 2012 Summer Olympics
Table tennis players at the 2016 Summer Olympics
Olympic table tennis players of Poland
Naturalized citizens of Poland
Chinese emigrants to Poland
Table tennis players from Tianjin
Table tennis players at the 2015 European Games
European Games competitors for Poland
Chinese male table tennis players
Naturalised table tennis players